Since 2010 The North-West University Gallery (NWU-Gallery) has formed part of PUK-Arts.

 

The NWU-Gallery has two operating art galleries. The main gallery, the NWU-Gallery, is situated on the North-West University's Potchefstroom Campus next to the Ferdinand Postma library, and has hosted a number of exhibitions. Some artists who have exhibited during 2011 include Rosemary Marriott, 2010 Standard Bank Young Artist Award winner Michael MacGarry  and band photographer Sean Brand.

The Botanical Garden Art Gallery, situated in the North-West University Botanical Garden, gives rising local artists the opportunity to exhibit within a professional gallery space. Some of the artists include MC Rood, Marguerite Visser  and Eugenie Marais.

Arts at the North-West University
The North-West University is a multi-campus university with a footprint spanning two provinces. The Mafikeng and Potchefstroom Campuses are situated in the North-West province and the Vaal Triangle Campus is in Gauteng. The NWU came into being on 1 January 2004 through the merger of two universities with differentiating histories, personalities and cultures – the Potchefstroom University for Christian Higher Education and the University of the North-West. The staff and students of the Sebokeng Campus of the former Vista University were also incorporated.

The North-West University Art Collection
The NWU has an extensive art collection that began in 1972 when some of the 66 artists that participated in the institution's first exhibition donated works. The cataloguing of the NWU Art Collection was completed under the management of the NWU Gallery with the appointment of a full-time curator in 2006. This publication forms part of the NWU Art Collection's vision and mission statement with regard to art procurement and audience development. Over the years, the collection expanded in an environment that nurtured the development of the arts, and now comprises 1197 artworks, including paintings, sculptures, graphic works, some examples of craft work and a spectacular variety of public artworks with contrasting historical identities. The entire collection currently consists of three previously separated collections: those of the old PUK, POK and the Ferdinand-Postma Library, with the addition of works, acquired more recently by the Institutional Office. Works by Maggie Laubser, Bettie Cilliers-Barnard, Judith Mason, George Boys, Robert Hodgins, JH Pierneef and Christo Coetzee are revered, with an appreciation for both contemporary artists and the old masters. The vision of the current curator of the collection is to make the collection accessible to a broader audience by means of interactive processes.
 
  
 Left: George Boys - Drift (1971)
 Centre: Bettie Cilliers-Barnard - Mymering (1949)
 Right: Christo Coetzee - Garden Party Portrait of Marjore Long (1985)

Two galleries at the Potchefstroom Campus regularly exhibit South African art: the Main Gallery and the NWU Botanical Garden Gallery.

Formally known as the old POK library, the Institutional Office now houses contemporary works by Peter Eastman (artist), Philemon Hlungwani, Stompie Selibe, Hanneke Benade, Sam Nhlengethwa, Claudette Schreuders and Diane Victor, amongst others. Completion of the interior design of the Institutional Office formed part of the brand roll-out for 2010 and the art is offset by contemporary furniture and some greenery. Typographic design, signage and finishing touches aim to supplement the existing environmental design.

In 2009, sculptor Marco Cianfanelli was commissioned to produce a work for the Institutional Office, reflected in the theme, ‘unity through diversity’. The sculpture consists of 76 steel sculpture profiles, of which the relief echoes the topography of the region. These profiles exhibit words pertinent to the NWU culture, in Afrikaans, English and Setswana.

The restored bronze statue of Totius, the name signifying the pen-name of Jakob Daniël du Toit, is an icon of profound importance to the NWU's community, past and present. The statue has found a new home on the Potchefstroom campus after receiving approval in 2009 from the Town Council. Approval was granted for the writer and poet's statue to receive a place in the intended Writers’ Garden, which forms part of the campus’ initiative to honour the great writers and poets of North West, including Sol Plaatje and Herman Charles Bosman. The first of the Potchefstroom poets to be honoured was TT Cloete, where his poems were recited in 2010 during a special occasion in the NWU Botanical Garden. Copper plates bearing extracts from his poems were then unveiled in the garden. Sol Plaatje's statue by Jo Roos was unveiled in 2010 and this sculpture has also found its place in the Writers’ Garden.

The Rendezvous Art Project 
The NWU has been involved in the Rendezvous art project since its inception in 2007. Initiated to develop links between business, educational institutions and the arts, this non-profit organisation supports community projects and artist development on various levels.

The first project was Rendezvous Focus Sculpture, which raised funds for some grade 12 students from Alexandra, enabling their application for tertiary education. The following project, Rendezvous Focus Wearable Art, raised funds for a bursary at the NWU in the faculty of humanities.

The third project, Rendezvous Focus Original Lithography, consisted of a series of travelling exhibitions at various venues throughout South Africa. The aim of this project was to forge cultural links between South Africa and France through exhibitions. The French component of these exhibitions was a collection of lithographic prints from the Ateliers Pons in Paris and South African artists working in the medium of lithography. The project gave eight South African artists the opportunity to travel to Paris and to be part of a workshop on lithography at the Atelier Pons. The artists work, produced in France, were showcased as part of the local travelling exhibition titled "Back from Paris".

The fourth project, titled Rendezvous FOCUS Painting, aspires to put together a travelling exhibition of works by 80 confirmed artists using painting as a medium. The aim of this exhibition is to give artists with different levels of experience the opportunity to participate in this group show at various venues within South Africa. As part of their ongoing commitment to strengthen international partnerships, this exhibition aims to initiate a succession of exchange projects between painters from South-Africa, France and Greece. Up to six promising artists will each be awarded with the BETTIE CILLIERS-BARNARD award. This award will give artists the opportunity to attend an international residency program in painting where they'll engage with the visited countries’ culture and local art exhibitions.

The Clover Aardklop National Arts Festival
The NWU is one of the main sponsors of the Aardklop National Art Festival, which seeks to create the opportunity for upcoming talent to perform with established artists. The NWU plays host to some of the exhibitions on the visual arts program.

Over the past 12 years, the festival has highlighted nationally and internationally renowned artists through the Festival Artist programme at the NWU's Main Gallery. Past guest artists include Kevin Brand, Deborah Bell, Judith Mason-Attwood, Berni Searle, Louis van Rensburg, Jan van der Merwe, Robert Hodgins, Marco Cianfanelli, Willem Boshoff, Nicholas Hlobo, Diane Victor, Conrad Botes and Angus Taylor. The 2011 Festival Artist was Sam Nhlengethwa.

The Botanical Garden Gallery exhibits artists that focus on environmental work or environmentally-conscious works, such as Strijdom van der Merwe’s works in 2009.

The Creative Quotient Festival (CQ-Fest) is held annually in conjunction with Aardklop and the Graphic Design subject group. It showcases the best of the advertising and design industries and includes the Cannes Lions and The Loerie Award road shows as well as student work from various design education institutions.

References

External links
 Rendezvous Art Project website
 Clover Aardklop website
 Puk Arts webpage

North-West University
Art museums and galleries in South Africa
University museums in South Africa
Museums in North West (South African province)
Potchefstroom